Cha Cha is the first live album by Dutch rock and roll and blues group Herman Brood & His Wild Romance. The album produced one single, "Still Believe." On the Dutch album chart, the album reached #2 on 13 January 1979, and stayed on the chart for 18 weeks. The album was certified gold in 1979.

Cha Cha is also the name of a movie filmed in 1979 with Herman Brood, Nina Hagen, and Lene Lovich, whose soundtrack was released separately on LP, also called Cha Cha. In the movie, he marries Nina Hagen; in reality they had a brief affair.

Cha Cha was re-released on CD in 1991 by Sony BMG/Ariola.

Track listing
All tracks composed by Herman Brood; except where noted.

Singles
The single "Still Believe" (with "Jilted" on the B-side) reached #15 in the Dutch Top 50 on 30 December 1978, and stayed on the chart for ten weeks. The single draws interest in Germany and France also.

Personnel
Herman Brood - piano, keyboard, vocals
Monica Tjen Akwoei - vocals
Bertus Borgers - saxophone
Freddy Cavalli - bass
Josee van Iersel - vocals
Danny Lademacher - guitar
Cees Meerman - drums
Robin Freeman - sound engineer
Anton Corbijn - photography

References 

Herman Brood & His Wild Romance albums
1978 live albums
Ariola Records albums